Molly Florence Wright (born 20 March 1996) is an English actress. For her debut film Apostasy (2017), she was named Young British/Irish Performer of the Year by the London Film Critics' Circle and nominated for two British Independent Film Awards. On television, she is known for her role in the BBC drama The A Word (2016–2020).

Early life
Wright is from Blackpool. She attended the Blackpool Sixth Form College. She then took the Foundation Acting course at the Academy of Live and Recorded Arts (ALRA) and joined an extras' agency to earn money.

Career
Wright made her television debut when she began starring in the BBC One drama The A Word as Rebecca Hughes, a role she would play for all three series from 2016 to 2020. Also in 2016, she played Lulu Lane in the second series of the military drama Our Girl, also on BBC One.

The following year, Wright made her feature film debut as Alex Whitling in Apostasy, which premiered at the 2017 Toronto International Film Festival. Wright won the London Film Critics Circle Award for Young British/Irish Actor of the Year and received nominations for two British Independent Film Awards and two National Film Awards in the supporting actress and newcomer categories.

Filmography

Awards and nominations

References

External links
 
 Molly Wright at Independent Talent

Living people
1996 births
21st-century English actresses
Actresses from Lancashire
People from Blackpool